Eagle Creek may refer to any of a number of places in the U.S. state of Oregon:

Rivers of Oregon